Mohamed Hamdy may refer to:

 Mohamed Hamdy Zaky (born 1991), Egyptian footballer 
 Mohamed Hamdy (footballer, born 1993), Egyptian footballer